Pieces of Eight is a 1980 role-playing game supplement for Skull & Crossbones, published by Fantasy Games Unlimited.

Contents
Pieces of Eight is a set of expansion rules for Skull & Crossbones with rules for voodoo, guidelines for doctors, new rules for ships, and three game scenarios.

Reception
Aaron Allston reviewed Pieces of Eight in The Space Gamer No. 39. Allston commented that "Recommended to those who have bought and liked the original RPG. Consider, though: if Skull and Crossbones is akin to a 16-chapter book with 8 chapters missing, and each of these supplements provides 1 or 2 of the missing chapters, this will become an expensive game."

References

Role-playing game books
Role-playing game supplements introduced in 1980